Abingdon Glebe House is a historic home located near Gloucester, Gloucester County, Virginia.  It was built around 1700, and is "T"-shaped brick structure with one-story hipped roof end pavilions flanking the central portion of the house. The central portion and rear ell are topped by steep gable roofs. It was extensively renovated about 1954. The house and surrounding glebe lands were owned by Abingdon Parish until they were confiscated by legislative act in 1802 as part of the Disestablishment. It was acquired by William Riddick of Gloucester in the 1980s, and was bequeathed to St. James On-the-Glebe Anglican Church, a parish of the Anglican Province of America, after Riddick's death in 2006.

It was added to the National Register of Historic Places in 1970.

See also
List of the oldest buildings in Virginia

References

External links
Abingdon Glebe House, U.S. Route 17 vicinity, Gloucester, Gloucester County, VA: 8 photos at Historic American Buildings Survey
St. James On-the-Glebe Anglican Church
SJOTG Facebook page

Historic American Buildings Survey in Virginia
Houses on the National Register of Historic Places in Virginia
Houses completed in 1700
Houses in Gloucester County, Virginia
National Register of Historic Places in Gloucester County, Virginia
1700 establishments in Virginia